North Central Province ( Uturumæda Paḷāta,  Wada Maththiya Mākāṇam) is one of the nine provinces of Sri Lanka, the first level administrative division of the country. The provinces have existed since the 19th century but did not have any legal status until 1987 when the 13th Amendment to the Constitution of Sri Lanka established provincial councils. The province is the largest by size, and second least populated in the country. The province consists of the districts of Anuradhapura and Polonnaruwa, both of which were important ancient Sri Lankan kingdoms. The climate is semi-arid, and the forests are dry evergreen forests.

History

The centralised system of Sri Lanka, which is a unitary state, failed to satisfy the aspirations of the people. There was growing insistence on decentralisation of administrative processes to achieve rapid economic and social development of the country.

In the Sri Lankan context, devolution means the transferring of political and administrative decision-making authority from the central government to elected bodies at the lower levels.

Demographics

Employment

Provincial council
The provincial council is the main administrative and control body in the North Central Province, which is the largest province in the country covering 16% of the country's total land area. It consists two districts, Polonnaruwa and Anuradhapure; Anuradhapure is the largest district in the country.

The province is also called Wew Bendi Rajje because there are more than 3000 medium and large scale tanks situated in the province. More than 65% of the province’s people depend on basic agriculture and agricultural based industries.

North Central Province has numerous potential for investors to start their businesses, specially agriculture, agricultural based industries and livestock sectors.

Administrative divisions

The North Central Province is divided into two districts and 29 divisional secretariats.

Districts

Divisional secretariats

Municipal Councils

Towns 
 Aralaganwila
 Bakamuna
 Eppawala
 Giritale
 Habarana
 Hingurakgoda
 Horowpothana
 Kahatagasdigiliya
 Kebithigollewa
 Kekirawa
 Mahailuppallama
 Manampitiya
 Maradankadawala
 Medawachchiya
 Mihintale
 Minneriya
 Nochchiyagama
 Padaviya
 Polonnaruwa-Kaduruwela
 Rambewa
 Thalawa
 Thambuttegama
 Welikanda

Education

Anuradhapura
 Anuradhapura Central College
 Niwaththaka Chethiya National School. Anuradhapura
 Anuradhapura Technical College 
 Buddhsravaka Bhiksu University
 K. B. Rathnayake MW
 Open University of Sri Lanka
 Rajarata University of Sri Lanka
 Sri Lanka Institute of Advanced Technological Education
 St. Joseph's College
 Teachers Training School
 University College of Anuradhapura (University of Vocational Technology)

Polonnaruwa
 Polonnaruwa Royal Central College
 Pulathisipura National College of Education
 Technical College-Polonnaruwa

See also
 Provinces of Sri Lanka
 Districts of Sri Lanka
 List of schools in North Central Province, Sri Lanka

References

External links
 North Central Province Provincial Council
 Cities in North Central province

 
Provinces of Sri Lanka
Kingdom of Kandy